Ronald E. Gray is an American politician. He is a Republican member of the Delaware House of Representatives, representing District 38. He was in elected in 2012 to replace Republican Gerald Hocker, who had resigned to run for a seat in the Delaware Senate.

Gray earned his bachelor's degree in civil engineering from the University of Delaware and his MBA from Indiana University.

Electoral history
In 2012, Gray won the general election with 7,902 votes (61.1%) against Democratic nominee Shirley Price, a former state representative for the 38th district. Price had served in the seat after being elected in 2000, but had been unseated by Hocker in 2002 and unsuccessfully ran to reclaim the seat in 2004.
In 2014, Gray was unopposed in the general election and won 7,133 votes.
In 2016, Gray was unopposed in the general election and won 12,188 votes.
In 2018, Gray won the general election with 9,635 votes (65.8%) against Democratic nominee Meghan M. Kelly.

References

External links
Official page at the Delaware General Assembly
Campaign site
 

Place of birth missing (living people)
Year of birth missing (living people)
Living people
Indiana University alumni
Republican Party members of the Delaware House of Representatives
University of Delaware alumni
21st-century American politicians